Parigi Moutong Regency is a regency of Central Sulawesi Province of Indonesia. It covers an area of 6,231.85 km2 and had a population of 413,588 at the 2010 Census and 440,015 at the 2020 Census; the official estimate as at mid 2021 was 443,170. The principal town lies at Parigi.

Administrative Districts 
Parigi Moutong Regency was divided at 2010 into twenty districts (kecamatan), but three additional districts were subsequently added. The districts are all tabulated below in geographical order, stretching clockwise around the Gulf of Tomini, with their areas and their populations at the 2010 Census  and 2020 Census, together with the official estimates as at mid 2021. The table also includes the locations of the district administrative centres, the number of villages in each district (rural desa and urban kelurahan), and its post code.

Notes: (a) The 2010 population of the new Sidoan District is included with the figure for Tinombo District. (b) The 2010 populations of the new Ongka Malino District and Bolano District are included with the figure for Bolano Lambunu District.

References

Regencies of Central Sulawesi